Tocher may refer to:

 dowry, in Scots-English

People
 John Tocher (1925-1991) British trade unionist
 K. D. Tocher (1921-1981) British computer scientist
 James Tocher Bain (1906-1988) Canadian engineer

Places
 Tocher, Aberdeenshire, Scotland, UK; see List of United Kingdom locations: To-Tq

Other uses
 Tocher (periodical), a periodical that publishes Gaidhlig-language content; see List of Scottish Gaelic periodicals
 Tocher and Tocher Taxidermists (1906-1968) Anglo-Indian firm in Bangalore, India; founded by William, succeeded by son Herbert, then in turn his son George.

See also

 Sweeney-Robertson-Tocher division
 
 
 Toch (disambiguation)
 Tosher (disambiguation)